Desert Hills High School (DHHS) is located in St. George, Utah, United States, and is the second newest of the five St. George 4A public high schools.  It is a part of the Washington County School District. Zone: south St. George, Bloomington, Bloomington Hills, Little Valley. Desert Hills High School's nickname is the Thunder and its mascot is Thor.

Sports
DHHS competes in the 4A division in region 10 with other Washington County schools and two high schools from Cedar City, Utah. Desert Hills will remain in 4A Region 9 for the 2019-2021 classification period.

Demographics
Desert Hills High School is considered by the NCES to be classified within a Rural: Fringe (41) area, defined as rural territory that is less than or equal to 5 miles from an urbanized area, as well as rural territory that is less than or equal to 2.5 miles from an urban cluster. NCES reports that 10.7% of students at DHHS are considered free lunch eligible, and 2.3% reduced-price lunch eligible.

References

External links

 Desert Hills historical information site
 Washington County School District
 Desert Hills High School website
 Boundaries

Buildings and structures in St. George, Utah
Public high schools in Utah
Educational institutions established in 2008
Schools in Washington County, Utah
2008 establishments in Utah